Events from the year 1992 in Argentina

Incumbents 

 President: Carlos Menem

Events 

 17 March: 1992 attack on Israeli embassy in Buenos Aires
 15 November: Ricardo Barreda murdered his family.

Sports 

 Argentina at the 1992 Summer Paralympics
 Argentina at the 1992 Summer Olympics
 1992 Argentina rugby union tour of Europe
 1992 Campeonato Argentino de Rugby
 1992 France rugby union tour of Argentina
 Argentina at the 1992 Winter Olympics

See also 

 List of Argentine films of 1992

References 

 
Years of the 20th century in Argentina
Argentina
1990s in Argentina
Argentina